12th NSFC Awards
December 19, 1977

Best Film: 
 Annie Hall 
The 12th National Society of Film Critics Awards, given on 19 December 1977, honored the best filmmaking of 1977.

Winners

Best Picture 
1. Annie Hall
2. That Obscure Object of Desire (Cet obscur objet du désir)
3. Close Encounters of the Third Kind

Best Director 
1. Luis Buñuel – That Obscure Object of Desire (Cet obscur objet du désir)
2. Steven Spielberg – Close Encounters of the Third Kind
3. Woody Allen – Annie Hall

Best Actor 
1. Art Carney – The Late Show
2. John Gielgud – Providence
3. Fernando Rey – That Obscure Object of Desire (Cet obscur objet du désir)
3. John Travolta – Saturday Night Fever

Best Actress 
1. Diane Keaton – Annie Hall
2. Shelley Duvall – 3 Women
3. Jane Fonda – Julia

Best Supporting Actor 
1. Edward Fox – A Bridge Too Far
2. Bill Macy – The Late Show
3. David Hemmings – Islands in the Stream
3. Maximilian Schell – Julia

Best Supporting Actress 
1. Ann Wedgeworth – Handle with Care
2. Marcia Rodd – Handle with Care
3. Sissy Spacek – 3 Women

Best Screenplay 
Woody Allen and Marshall Brickman– Annie Hall

Best Cinematography 
Thomas Mauch – Aguirre, the Wrath of God (Aguirre, der Zorn Gottes)

References

External links
Past Awards

1977
National Society of Film Critics Awards
National Society of Film Critics Awards
National Society of Film Critics Awards